Celebration Park is an archaeological park in the western United States, located in southwestern Idaho. It is the state's first archeological park and is adjacent to the Snake River near Melba and Walter's Ferry in Canyon County.

It features camping, restrooms, drinking water, picnicking, self-guided tours, and interpretive programs as well as fishing and access to hiking trails and the Snake River with a small day use fee.

History

This park features in-situ petroglyphs rock carvings made by Native Americans dating created more than 12,000 years ago. During the winter, the Paiute lived at lower elevations along the Snake River  like at this site, and this region was also home to Shoshone. A fresh water spring in the park area made it an ideal camping spot for many generations.

The park's Guffey railroad bridge over the Snake River was built  in 1897, to carry gold and silver ore from Silver City in the Owyhee mountains to Nampa for smelting. It has been refurbished and is open for walking and horseback riding. It is the only Parker-Through-Truss railroad bridge in Idaho and is the state's largest historic artifact; it was entered into the National Register of Historic Places in 1978. The bridge was abandoned  in 1947, saved from demolition in the 1970s, and purchased and restored by Canyon County government in 1989.

The park is within the Guffey Butte–Black Butte Archeological District, listed on the National Register of HIstoric Places.

References

External links
 Canyon County Idaho- Celebration Park including maps of hiking trails. 
 Every Trail- Halverson Lake Loop Trail includes maps and pictures that you can add to.

Tourist attractions in Canyon County, Idaho
Protected areas of Canyon County, Idaho
Archaeological sites in Idaho